was a museum located inside the Saitama Super Arena in Chūō-ku, Saitama, Saitama Prefecture, Japan.

History
The John Lennon Museum opened on October 9, 2000, the 60th anniversary of Lennon's birth, and closed on September 30, 2010, when its exhibit contract with Yoko Ono expired. It was located inside the Saitama Super Arena in Chūō-ku, Saitama, Saitama Prefecture, Japan.

Contents
The museum was established to preserve knowledge of John Lennon's life and musical career; it displayed Lennon's widow Yoko Ono's collection of his memorabilia as well as other displays. A tour of the museum began with a welcoming message and short film narrated by Yoko Ono (in Japanese with English headphones available), and ended at an avant-garde styled "reflection room" full of chairs facing a slide show of moving words and images. After this room there was a gift shop with John Lennon memorabilia available.

See also 
 List of music museums

References

External links
John Lennon Museum (in English by JLM, Co., Ltd.)

Lennon
Lennon, John
Buildings and structures in Saitama (city)
Museums in Saitama Prefecture
Defunct museums in Japan
Museums established in 2000
Museums disestablished in 2010
2000 establishments in Japan
2010 disestablishments in Japan
John Lennon
Monuments and memorials to John Lennon